Alphaherpesvirinae is a subfamily of viruses in the family Herpesviridae, primarily distinguished by reproducing more quickly than other subfamilies in the Herpesviridae. In animal virology the most important herpesviruses belong to the Alphaherpesvirinae. Pseudorabies virus is the causative agent of Aujeszky's disease in pigs and Bovine herpesvirus 1 is the causative agent of bovine infectious rhinotracheitis and pustular vulvovaginitis. Mammals serve as natural hosts. There are currently 45 species in this subfamily, divided among 5 genera with one species unassigned to a genus. Diseases associated with this subfamily include: HHV-1 and HHV-2: skin vesicles or mucosal ulcers, rarely encephalitis and meningitis, HHV-3: chickenpox (varicella) and shingles, GaHV-2: Marek's disease.

Genera 
Alphaherpesvirinae consists of the following five genera:

 Iltovirus
 Mardivirus
 Scutavirus
 Simplexvirus
 Varicellovirus

The species Chelonid alphaherpesvirus 6 is currently unassigned to a genus.

Structure 
Viruses in Alphaherpesvirinae are enveloped, with icosahedral, spherical to pleomorphic, and round geometries, and T=16 symmetry. The diameter is around 150-200 nm. Genomes are linear and non-segmented, around 120 to 180 kb in length.

Life cycle 
Viral replication is nuclear, and is lysogenic. Entry into the host cell is achieved by attachment of the viral gB, gC, gD and gH proteins to host receptors, which mediates endocytosis. Replication follows the dsDNA bidirectional replication model. DNA-templated transcription, with some alternative splicing mechanism is the method of transcription. Translation takes place by leaky scanning. The virus exits the host cell by nuclear egress, budding, and microtubular outwards viral transport.
Mammals serve as the natural host. Transmission routes are sexual, contact, body fluids, lesions, and respiratory.

References

External links 

 
 Viralzone: Alphaherpesvirinae
 ICTV
 Animal Viruses

 
Herpesviridae
Animal virology
Herpesvirales
Virus subfamilies